Rajnagar Assembly constituency is one of the 230 Vidhan Sabha (Legislative Assembly) constituencies of Madhya Pradesh state in central India. This constituency came into existence in 1951, as one of the 48 Vidhan Sabha constituencies of the erstwhile Vindhya Pradesh state but it was abolished in 1956. It came into existence again in 2008, following delimitation of legislative assembly constituencies.

Overview
Rajnagar (constituency number 50) is one of the 6 Vidhan Sabha constituencies located in Chhatarpur district. This constituency covers the Khajuraho, Lavkush Nagar and Rajnagar nagar panchayats and parts of Lavkush Nagar and Rajnagar tehsils of the district.

Rajnagar is part of Khajuraho Lok Sabha constituency along with seven other Vidhan Sabha segments, namely, Chandla in this district, Pawai, Gunnaor and Panna in Panna district and Vijayraghavgarh, Murwara and Bahoriband in Katni district.

Members of Legislative Assembly

As a constituency of Madhya Bharat
 1951: Gokal Prasad, Indian National Congress

As a constituency of Madhya Pradesh

Election results

2013 results

See also
 Laundi
 Khajuraho
 Rajnagar

References

Chhatarpur district
Assembly constituencies of Madhya Pradesh